William Kemp may refer to:

William Kempe (died 1603), also spelled William Kemp, English actor and dancer, one of the original actors in William Shakespeare's plays
William D. Kemp (architect), architect
William E. Kemp (1889–1968), mayor of Kansas City, Missouri, U.S.
William Herbert Kemp (1881–1957), British chemist and politician
Will Kemp (actor, born 1977), contemporary film actor
Willy Kemp (1925–2021), Luxembourgish road bicycle racer
Willie Kemp (1888–1965), Scottish singer and writer
Willie Kemp (basketball) (born 1987), American basketball player

See also
William Kempe (disambiguation)